Collection Simple Plus is a compilation CD album by Ali Project that compiles songs from the singles they had previously released under Victor Entertainment. There are two versions. A limited edition version (catalog number: VIZL-198) has 12 tracks and a bonus DVD, containing the promo video for "Bōkoku Kakusei Catharsis" and a video clip of them performing "Gesshoku Grand Guignol" live. The regular edition (catalog number: VICL-61999) has a thirteenth track, an orchestrated version of "Bōkoku Kakusei Catharsis". A majority of the songs are anime tie-ups. This album peaked at No. 7 on the Oricon charts and sold 45,616 copies in total.

Track listing

CD

DVD

References

External links 
 

Ali Project albums
2006 compilation albums
Victor Entertainment compilation albums